James Thomas "Jimmy" Draper Jr. (born October 10, 1935) was president of the Southern Baptist Convention from 1982 to 1984.

He signed the Manhattan Declaration in 2009.

See also

List of Southern Baptist Convention affiliated people
Southern Baptist Convention
Southern Baptist Convention Presidents

Bibliography
 Authority: The Critical Issues for Southern Baptists (1984)
 We Believe: Living in the Light of God's Truth (2004)
 Biblical Authority: The Critical Issue for the Body of Christ (2001)
 Every Christian a Minister: Finding Joy and Fulfillment in Serving God (2001)

References

External links
 AM570 The Mission WMCA 
 
 
 archived
Life and Religion 

Central Baptist Church: singles archived

1935 births
Living people
Writers from Kansas City, Missouri
Southern Baptist ministers
Baptist writers
Baylor University alumni
Southern Baptist Convention presidents
Southwestern Baptist Theological Seminary alumni
People from Warren, Arkansas
Baptists from Arkansas